SL-75102, or progabide acid, is an active metabolite of progabide and an anticonvulsant GABA receptor agonist.

References

Imines
Anticonvulsants
GABA receptor agonists
Chloroarenes
Fluoroarenes